The Reluctant Dragon is a British stop motion animation film created by Cosgrove Hall Films, airing on ITV in 1987. It is based on the story of the same name by Kenneth Grahame.

Cast
Robin Bailey - St George
Simon Callow - Dragon
Jimmy Hibbert
Martin Jarvis - Narrator / Boy / Father 
Edward Kelsey
Brian Trueman
Daphne Oxenford - Mother

References

External links 

ITV children's television shows
English-language television shows
Animated films about dragons
Films based on works by Kenneth Grahame